The armorial of British universities is the collection of coats of arms of universities in the United Kingdom. Modern arms of universities began appearing in England around the middle of the 15th century, with Oxford's being possibly the oldest university arms in the world, being adopted around the end of the 14th century. The earliest granting of university arms was to King's College Cambridge by Henry VIII in 1449. Arms are granted by the College of Arms and Lyon Court. It has been suggested that new universities register arms is an attempt to appear more traditional or legitimate. As corporations, older university arms have historically been granted without a crest, however newer institutions use crests with mantling, including new colleges at older universities. The first crest granted to a university was to Leeds in 1905 while the first British university to be granted supporters was Sussex in 1962, although both Oxford and Cambridge have used angels as supporters and Cambridge has used the 'alma mater' emblem as a crest without these components being officially granted.

University and college arms often incorporate, or are simply copies of, arms of their founders or local authorities. At collegiate universities, constituent colleges may bear their own arms, such as at Cambridge and Oxford. Many older coats of arms were recorded by Arthur Charles Fox-Davies in The Book of Public Arms in 1915, which also recorded some coats of arms of constituent colleges, and by John Woodward in A Treatise on Ecclesiastical Heraldry in 1894. Most university mottos are not granted with the coats of arms, instead being added by custom by the institution, an exception to this being the arms of Imperial College London. Those universities in Ireland that existed prior to independence from the United Kingdom were granted arms along the lines of other British universities; these are listed separately below.

An open book (referencing historically the Christian bible) as symbol of 'wisdom', 'knowledge', 'learning' is common to many arms. A flaming torch or sometimes a lamp representing enlightenment features often, as does a wheatsheaf symbolising growth and an owl representing wisdom. A martlet representing strenuous effort is sometimes found. Keys in the form of crossed keys, pairs of keys or a single key held by a beast are also common to several university arms.  The keys represent access to heaven and symbolically the access to greater things brought about through education.

Not all universities have a coat of arms. Many arts universities are not armigerous:

 Arts University Bournemouth
 Arts University Plymouth
 Leeds Arts University
 Norwich University of the Arts
 Ravensbourne University London
 University for the Creative Arts

Additionally, the following are also non-armigerous:

 Arden University
 Bath Spa University
 BPP University
 Leeds Beckett University
 Oxford Brookes University
 Regent's University London
 University of Bedfordshire
 University of Brighton
 University of Cumbria
 University of Roehampton
 University of West London

The images below may be either be the coat of arms in the form of a shield (escutcheon) or the 'full heraldic achievement', as granted by the College of Arms or the Lyon Court.

Arms of universities

Arms of constituent colleges

Cambridge

Durham

Lancaster

London

Nottingham

Oxford

Roehampton

West London

Former universities

Universities formerly within the United Kingdom

Former constituent colleges

See also 
Armorial of UK schools
The Armorial Register
Heraldry
List of universities in the United Kingdom
Universities in the United Kingdom

References 

Armorials of the United Kingdom
British heraldry
Armorial